The Bailey Covered Bridge is a historic covered bridge in Amity, Washington County, Pennsylvania.  It crosses Ten Mile Creek.  It is 15 by 66 feet. It was constructed in 1899 on property owned by the Bailey brothers. The original structure was burned in 1994 and replaced with the current structure. It is the last burr arch covered bridge in the county.
It is designated as a historic bridge by the Washington County History & Landmarks Foundation.

References

External links

[ National Register nomination form]

Covered bridges on the National Register of Historic Places in Pennsylvania
Covered bridges in Washington County, Pennsylvania
National Register of Historic Places in Washington County, Pennsylvania
Road bridges on the National Register of Historic Places in Pennsylvania
Wooden bridges in Pennsylvania
Burr Truss bridges in the United States